Your Eyes may refer to:

Albums 
Your Eyes (album), by Kult, 1991

Songs 
"Your Eyes" (Arashi song), 2012
"Your Eyes" (Jai Waetford song), 2013
"Your Eyes" (Kate Ryan song), 2008
"Your Eyes" (Stray Kids song), 2022
"Your Eyes", by Cook da Books from the La Boum 2 soundtrack, 1982
"Your Eyes", by the Damned from Music for Pleasure, 1977
"Your Eyes", by Diplo from Diplo, 2022
"Your Eyes", by Hardline from II, 2002
"Your Eyes", by Simply Red from Love and the Russian Winter, 1999
"Your Eyes", by the Sundays from Static & Silence, 1997
"Your Eyes", by Underground Lovers from Leaves Me Blind, 1992
"Your Eyes", from the musical Rent, 1996
"Your Eyes", written by Edwin Schneider

See also
For Your Eyes Only (disambiguation)
In Your Eyes (disambiguation)